Abbey was an electoral ward covering the centre of Bath, England. It was abolished as part of the boundary changes effected at the elections held on 2 May 2019.

Abbey is rarely used as the name of an area of Bath, and was primarily used just for electoral purposes within the Bath and North East Somerset unitary authority; it elected two councillors.

St John's Catholic Primary School is located on the eastern edge of the former ward.

The electoral wards surrounding the ward were: Lansdown and Walcot to the north, Bathwick to the east, Widcombe to the south, and Kingsmead to the west.

Notable places
Some notable places within the former ward are:
Assembly Rooms
Bath Abbey
The Circus
Grand Pump Room
Guildhall
Pulteney Bridge
Recreation Ground
Roman Baths
Thermae Bath Spa

References

External links
Bath & North East Somerset Council: Abbey ward, Openly Local
Ward Profile - Abbey, Bath and North East Somerset
Election results for Abbey, 3 May 2007, Bath and North East Somerset

Areas of Bath, Somerset
Electoral wards in Bath and North East Somerset